José de las Fuentes Rodríguez (April 20, 1920 – October 8, 2011) was a Mexican politician and lawyer. He served as the Governor of Coahuila from December 1, 1981, to November 1, 1987.

De Las Fuentes received his law degree from the National Autonomous University of Mexico in 1944. He later earned a doctorate in criminal law.

De las Fuentes began his career in public service at the National Company for Basic Commodities (Conasupo). He served as the Attorney General of Coahuila from 1957 to 1963. He was elected as a deputy to the Chamber of Deputies of Mexico for two terms. He was the President of the Chamber of Deputies in 1968. He also taught as a professor at the National Autonomous University of Mexico.

José de las Fuentes Rodríguez served as the Governor of Coahuila from 1981 to 1987. He made access to new housing programs a priority of his administration. Several new facilities were also constructed in Coahuila during his tenure, including a new state government center and the major Coahuila convention center.

José de las Fuentes Rodríguez died in Mexico City, where he lived during his later years, on October 8, 2011, at the age of 91. He was survived by his children - Guadalupe, José, Arturo, and Fernando de las Fuentes Hernández. His wife, Elsa Hernández Salazar, died in 1984. The couple had met in Mexico City and Veracruz. His funeral was held in Saltillo, the capital of Coahuila.

References

1920 births
2011 deaths
Governors of Coahuila
20th-century Mexican lawyers
Members of the Chamber of Deputies (Mexico) for Coahuila
Presidents of the Chamber of Deputies (Mexico)
Academic staff of the National Autonomous University of Mexico
National Autonomous University of Mexico alumni
20th-century Mexican politicians
Mexican prosecutors
Academic staff of the Autonomous University of Coahuila
Heads of universities and colleges in Mexico
Deputies of the L Legislature of Mexico